The surname Fairburn may refer to:
 Charles Fairburn (1887–1945), Chief Mechanical Engineer of the London Midland & Scottish Railway
 Harold Fairburn (1884–1973), Inspector-General of the Straits Settlements Police (Singapore) 
 Jeff Fairburn (born 1966), British businessman
 Paul Fairburn, British radio broadcaster
 Rex Fairburn (1904–1957), New Zealand poet
 William Armstrong Fairburn (1876–1947), author, naval architect, marine engineer, and industrialist
 William E. Fairbairn, (1885-1960) British Royal Marine and police officer.

Surnames